Ami Vashi is an Indian model, dancer and beauty pageant titleholder. She won the Femina Miss India title in 2003 and represented India in the Miss World 2003 competition where and was placed fourth out of five finalists.

Family
Her father is Jay Prakash and her mother is Bhadra Vashi.

Personal information
Vashi grew up in Los Angeles. She currently divides her time between Pasadena in California and Mumbai. She is a graduate of the University of Southern California.

Career
In addition to her fashion-related work, Vashi practices Indian classical dance and yoga and is involved in various community service initiatives in the Los Angeles area and in India.

References

External links

Femina Miss India winners
Female models from California
Living people
Miss World 2003 delegates
Year of birth missing (living people)
Female models from Mumbai
21st-century American women